Joshua Earl Patrick Phillips (born March 17, 1984) is an American who was convicted of murder as a child. In November 1998, when he was 14 years old, Phillips killed Maddie Clifton, his 8-year-old friend and neighbor. The following year, he was sentenced to life imprisonment without the possibility of parole. Phillips stated that he killed Clifton to stop her from crying after she was accidentally struck with a baseball while they were playing, and that he feared punishment from his abusive father. Although elements of Phillips's story are disputed, officials who were involved in his prosecution have subsequently expressed contrition over the severity of his sentence. Phillips is eligible for re-sentencing in 2023.

Early life
Phillips was born in Allentown, Pennsylvania, on March 17, 1984, to Steve and Melissa Phillips. Steve, a drug addict and alcoholic, was violent towards Phillips and Melissa, who both reported living in fear of him. Steve imposed strict rules on his son, got angry if he had other children in the house when he was not present, and particularly disliked young girls; Melissa said she never understood why her husband disliked girls. Eventually, Steve decided to relocate the family from Lehigh Valley, Pennsylvania to Florida, separating Josh from his half-brothers Daniel and Benjie.

In November 1998, Phillips was 14 years old and living with his family in Jacksonville, Florida. Neighbors described Phillips as "quiet and friendly". According to Maddie Clifton's mother, Phillips and her daughter were friends and she never had any reason to be afraid of him. Phillips had no arrests or history of violence prior to the murder. His school teacher said he was a popular student who did not stand out, describing him as fun and silly.

Murder of Maddie Clifton
According to Phillips, on November 3, 1998, he was home alone when Maddie Clifton, who lived across the road from the Phillips, came to his house asking him to come outside and play baseball. Phillips agreed, even though he was not allowed to have friends over while his parents were not home. As the two were playing baseball, Phillips accidentally hit the ball into Clifton's eye, causing her to bleed, cry, and scream. Phillips panicked, knowing his father Steve would be home soon and fearing his reaction. Phillips dragged Clifton into his house, saying that the clothing came off Clifton's lower body as he did so. He hit her with the baseball bat to stop her from screaming before putting her under the base of his bed. When Steve returned home, Phillips interacted with him for a period of time before returning to his room. When Phillips discovered that Clifton was still alive and moaning under his bed, he removed the mattress, cut her throat, and stabbed her in the chest seven times with the knife from a Leatherman tool, killing her.

Clifton's disappearance was reported around 5:00pm that day. Police and volunteers searched for Clifton for six days; Phillips participated in the search. He later stated he spent the following week living in denial, saying, "I was putting myself in a fantasy world that nothing had happened. That was my defense mechanism for everything when I was a kid. I never made the decision... to ignore it. I just did." 

On November 10, Melissa Phillips went into her son's room and noticed a wet spot on the floor. She searched the room and found Clifton's body, immediately leaving the house to report the incident to the police. Phillips was arrested later that day at his school, and confessed to the murder within hours.

Prosecutors disputed some parts of Phillips's story. State Attorney Harry Shorstein suggested the murder may have been sexually motivated, saying that Phillips had talked about sexual matters with both Maddie Clifton and her older sister. The autopsy found no evidence of sexual assault, though prosecutors argued the lack of dirt and sand on Clifton's body did not support Phillips's assertion that her clothes came off as he dragged her into his room. Prosecutors also noted that no blood was found in the backyard, or on the baseball that Phillips said had struck Clifton, and argued that this did not support his version of events.

Trial
Phillips was tried as an adult. The trial was moved from Duval County, Florida, to Polk County over concerns about the publicity in Jacksonville. Phillips's lawyer, Richard D. Nichols, did not call a single witness for the defense, a move the prosecutors later said was a surprising and risky strategy. Nichols intended to base much of the defense on a closing argument to the jury, where he stated Clifton's death was "an act that began as an accident and deteriorated through panic that bordered on madness". According to Phillips, Nichols never attempted to question him over the events of the murder, and only played chess with him when visiting him in prison prior to the trial. Melissa Phillips disagreed with Nichols's strategy, though Steve insisted on letting the lawyer do as he pleased. Nichols discouraged Phillips's parents from allowing him to testify. Accordingly, Phillips never spoke during his trial. The trial started on July 6, 1999, and lasted only two days, an unusually short time due to the defense calling no witnesses. Jurors took just over two hours to convict Phillips of first-degree murder. He was later sentenced to life imprisonment without the possibility of parole; he was not eligible for the death penalty as he was under 16.

During the trial the defense attempted to introduce scans from a neurologist showing bilateral lesions on the frontal lobe of Phillips's brain, which are associated with panic and impaired judgement, while the prosecution wanted to discuss evidence Phillips had looked at pornography on his computer. The judge, however, ruled both pieces of evidence inadmissible.

Life in prison
Phillips completed his General Educational Development in prison, although he was initially told he was too young to do it, and later took college classes by correspondence. Phillips works as a paralegal in prison, assisting other inmates with their appeals, and also works as a tutor for inmates. He also plays guitar in a band, and participates in Christian religious services, zazen and yoga. During his 2017 appeal, the prosecution acknowledged that Phillips had been a model prisoner. As of 2008, Phillips declined to write a letter of apology to Clifton's family, saying they deserved an apology from him in person, as they would not be able to see his sincerity in a letter. Clifton's mother subsequently stated she had no interest in talking to Phillips. As of 2021, Phillips is imprisoned in the Taylor Annex.

On June 27, 2000, Steve Phillips was killed in a car accident.

Appeals

In 2002, the Florida Second District Court of Appeal upheld Phillips's conviction. In December 2004, Melissa Phillips began to seek a new trial for her son, stating his young age at the time of the murder should have carried more weight in his sentence. In November 2005, the Supreme Court of Florida set a hearing for the following month to discuss whether Phillips should receive a new trial. In 2008, two of the officials most responsible for Phillips's life sentence, Harry Shorstein and Sheriff Nat Glover, admitted having second thoughts about giving a life sentence without the possibility of parole to a 14-year-old. Shorstein said he regretted not offering Phillips a second-degree murder plea, which would have given the judge more discretion in sentencing, and has voiced his support for eventual clemency or parole for Phillips. 

In 2012, the Supreme Court of the United States case of Miller v. Alabama ruled that sentencing juveniles to mandatory life in prison without parole is unconstitutional. In November 2015, Phillips's attorneys were considering Miller v. Alabama as a basis to file a re-sentencing hearing. In September 2016, Phillips's attorneys successfully appealed the court, and he was granted a new sentencing hearing, which was held in June 2017. At the hearing, Clifton's mother requested that his sentence be upheld. In November 2017, Phillips was re-sentenced to life in prison, but is eligible for re-sentencing again in 2023. In December 2019, the Florida First District Court of Appeal upheld the life sentence, saying it will be reviewed again and could be modified in 2023 "based on demonstrated maturity and rehabilitation." Phillips subsequently appealed to the Supreme Court of Florida, who turned down his request in June 2020. As is customary, they did not explain their reasons for declining to hear the case.

In the media
In 1999, the murder was the subject of a documentary on 48 Hours titled "Why Did Josh Kill?" The murder was featured on the season 2 premiere of Killer Kids in 2012. In 2018, Phillips was interviewed by British journalist Susanna Reid for the ITV documentary Children Who Kill. That same year, the murder and Phillips's trial were featured on an episode of the podcast Sword and Scale. The murder and Phillips's appeal were featured in two episodes of Morbid: A True Crime Podcast, released in 2019 and 2020 respectively.

See also
Lionel Tate
Mary Bell

References

1984 births
Living people
1998 murders in the United States
20th-century American criminals
American male criminals
American murderers of children
American people convicted of murder
American prisoners sentenced to life imprisonment
Crime in Florida
Criminals from Florida
Male murderers
Minors convicted of murder
Murder committed by minors
People convicted of murder by Florida
Criminals from Allentown, Pennsylvania
People from Jacksonville, Florida
Prisoners sentenced to life imprisonment by Florida
Violence against women in the United States